Conan the Avenger is a 1968 collection of two fantasy works written by Björn Nyberg, Robert E. Howard and L. Sprague de Camp featuring Robert E. Howard's sword and sorcery hero Conan the Barbarian. It was first published in paperback by Lancer Books, and has been reprinted a number of times since by various publishers. It has also been translated into Japanese, German and Spanish.

Contents
"Introduction", by L. Sprague de Camp
The Return of Conan (Björn Nyberg and L. Sprague de Camp)
"The Hyborian Age, Part 2" (Robert E. Howard)

The Return of Conan
In the kingdom of Aquilonia, a year of peace for King Conan and his new queen Zenobia is broken when the latter is abducted by a demon. Conan learns from the wizard Pelias of Koth that the eastern sorcerer Yah Chieng of Khitai is responsible, and begins a quest to recover her, little realizing that the fate of the world as well as Aquilonia rests on the outcome of the contest.

Chronologically, The Return of Conan falls between Howard's novel The Hour of the Dragon (also known as Conan the Conqueror), and the four short stories collected as Conan of Aquilonia.

The Hyborian Age, Part 2
The second part of Howard's essay detailing the pseudohistorical prehistory in which the Conan stories are set describes the period from Conan's day through the end of Hyborian era and beyond.

References

1968 short story collections
Fantasy short story collections
Short story collections by L. Sprague de Camp
Conan the Barbarian books
Lancer Books books